Channel 51 may refer to several television stations:

 Channel 51 (New Zealand), a regional television station based in Napier, Hawke's Bay, New Zealand

Canada
The following television stations broadcast on digital channel 51 (UHF frequencies covering 693.25-697.75 MHz) in Canada:
 CBWFT-DT in Winnipeg, Manitoba
 CHCH-DT-2 in London, Ontario

The following television stations operate on virtual channel 51 in Canada:
 CHCH-DT-2 in London, Ontario
 CKEM-DT in Edmonton, Alberta

See also
 Channel 51 TV stations in Mexico
 Channel 51 digital TV stations in the United States
 Channel 51 virtual TV stations in the United States
 Channel 51 low-power TV stations in the United States

51